This is a list of the 13 members of the European Parliament for Ireland elected at the 2004 European Parliament election. They served in the 2004 to 2009 session.

List

†Replaced during term, see table below for details.

Changes

See also
Members of the European Parliament 2004–2009 – List by country
List of members of the European Parliament, 2004–2009 – Full alphabetical list

External links
ElectionsIreland.org – 2004 European Parliament (Ireland) election results
European Parliament office in Ireland – Irish MEPs: 2004–09

2004-09
European Parliament
 List
Ireland